Laurence McCormack (20 May 1882 – 13 September 1935) was an Irish Gaelic footballer. His championship career with the Louth senior team spanned fifteen years from 1904 until 1919.

Honours

Tredaghs
Louth Senior Football Championship (4): 1906, 1909, 1910, 1912

Boyne Rangers
Louth Senior Football Championship (1): 1921

Louth
All-Ireland Senior Football Championship (1): 1910 (c)
Leinster Senior Football Championship (2): 1909, 1910 (c)

References

1882 births
1935 deaths
Louth inter-county Gaelic footballers